The men's high jump at the 2019 World Athletics Championships was held at the Khalifa International Stadium in Doha from 1 to 4 October.

Summary
When Qatari officials put together the bid to host these championships, Doha born Mutaz Essa Barshim was a 23 year old already with a World Junior Championship, Olympic bronze and World Championship silver to his name.  Qatari officials could see the potential.  This was the day they were waiting for, when a now 28 year old was jumping at home.  Now there was a bonus, he was defending champion.

The finals pared down to 7 over 2.30m.  At 2.33m, Mikhail Akimenko got over on his first attempt to maintain a clean round and Maksim Nedasekau also was over on his first attempt.  Shudder, Barshim, who had a clean series going so far, missed along with five others (veteran Gianmarco Tamberi saved attempts after missing 2.30m once).  On the second attempt, everyone missed again.  Tamberi eliminated, that trend started the third round of attempts as Luis Zayas and Michael Mason missed and were eliminated.  Then it was Barshim's last attempt.  He got over it and sighs of relief could be heard all over Qatar.  Next up, Brandon Starc missed, then Ilya Ivanyuk also made it to leave four over 2.33m, with Akimenko holding the advantage.

Moving up to 2.35m, Nedasekau missed, then Barshim, Akimenko and Ivanyuk all made it on their first attempts.  Akimenko still had a clean series.  With three earlier misses, vs two each for Barshim and Ivanyuk, Nedasekau could see he was off the podium and passed.  At , Nedasekau missed.  Next up, on his first attempt, Barshim made it, and no else was able to clear the height.

Records
Before the competition records were as follows:

Qualification standard
The standard to automatically qualify for entry was 2.30 m. for a quota number of 32 athletes.

Only 24 high jumpers reached 2.30 m during the qualification period (2018-2019), indoors and outdoors. The final entries were made by completing to 31 athletes, including the defending world champion Mutaz Essa Barshim (wild card, only 2.27 m before the competition) and 1 Best country athlete, Lee Hup Wei.

The qualifiers with less than 2.30 m are:
Douwe Amels, 2.28 m (q)
Adrijus Glebauskas, 2.28 m (q)
Luis Castro, 2.28 m (q)
Mathew Sawe, ACh, 2.28 m (Q)
Keenon Laine, 2.28 m indoor (q) [2.26] (2018)
Lee Hup Wei, BCA, 2.27 m in Kuala Lumpur (31 Mar 2019)
Ryo Sato, 2.27 m (q)

Schedule
The event schedule, in local time (UTC+3), was as follows:

Results

Qualification
Qualification: 2.31 m (Q) or at least 12 best performers (q).

Final
The final was started on 4 October at 20:15.

References

High jump
High jump at the World Athletics Championships